Kopytów may refer to the following places:

 Kopytów, Lublin Voivodeship, a village in Lublin Voivodeship, Poland
 Kopytów, Masovian Voivodeship, a village in Masovian Voivodeship, Poland

 Kopytov, a village and administrative part of the town of Bohumín, Czech Republic